"Desire" is the sixth single by Japanese rock band Luna Sea, released on November 13, 1995. The song was the band's second number 1 on the Oricon Singles Chart, charted for 14 weeks, and is their second best-selling single, behind only "Storm". This version of "Luv U" is slightly different from the one on the album, Style.

Track listing
All songs written and composed by Luna Sea.

"Desire" - 4:22Originally composed by Sugizo.
"Luv U" - 5:25Originally composed by Inoran.

References

Luna Sea songs
Oricon Weekly number-one singles
1995 singles
1995 songs